Ronald Lynn Thomas (July 9, 1959 – April 11, 2021) was an American professional football player who was a defensive back for two seasons with the San Francisco 49ers of the National Football League (NFL). He was selected by the 49ers in the fifth round of the 1981 NFL Draft. He played college football at the University of Pittsburgh and attended Pascagoula High School in Pascagoula, Mississippi. Thomas was also a member of the Oakland Invaders of the United States Football League. He was a member of the San Francisco 49ers team that won Super Bowl XVI.

On April 14, 2021, it was announced that Thomas had died at the age of 61.

References

External links
Just Sports Stats
Fanbase profile

2021 deaths
1959 births
Players of American football from Mississippi
American football defensive backs
African-American players of American football
Pittsburgh Panthers football players
San Francisco 49ers players
Oakland Invaders players
People from Pascagoula, Mississippi
20th-century African-American sportspeople
21st-century African-American people